Christine Fabréga (8 April 1931 in Paris – 11 June 1988) was a French actress and television personality.

Filmography
 1953: Le gang des pianos à bretelles - un mannequin
 1966: Le deuxième souffle (directed by Jean-Pierre Melville, starring Lino Ventura) - Simone - dite 'Manouche'
 1967: Les risques du métier (directed by André Cayatte, starring Jacques Brel) - Madame Roussel
 1970: La peau de Torpédo (directed by Jean Delannoy, starring Michel Constantin) - Sylvianne Collet
 1972: Nous ne vieillirons pas ensemble (directed by Maurice Pialat, starring Jean Yanne) - mère de Catherine
 1973: Deux hommes dans la ville (directed by José Giovanni, starring Jean Gabin) - Geneviève Cazeneuve
 1974: Les murs ont des oreilles (directed by Jean Girault, starring Louis Velle) - Gilda, la cuisinière
 1974: C'est jeune et ça sait tout aka. Ya pas de mal à se faire du bien (directed by Claude Mulot)
 1975: Tamara ou Comment j'ai enterré ma vie de jeune fille (directed by Michel Berkowitch)
 1976: Pourquoi? (directed by Anouk Bernard, starring Gérard Barray) - la psychologue
 1978: L'Exercice du pouvoir (directed by Philippe Galland, starring Michel Aumont)

External links
 

French film actresses
French television presenters
1931 births
1988 deaths
Burials at Père Lachaise Cemetery
20th-century French actresses
French women television presenters